Iain Bell (born 1980) is an English composer whose output is predominantly of vocal works, namely opera, art song or orchestral song.

Life and career
Bell was born in London. The cast included Marie McLaughlin as Mother Needham and Nathan Gunn as James Dalton. The lead role of Moll Hackabout was created by German coloratura soprano Diana Damrau for whom the composer has written a great deal of music. 

Bell's second opera is an adaptation of Charles Dickens's own one-man version of his novella A Christmas Carol commissioned by Houston Grand Opera where it received its world premiere in December 2014, directed by the British actor, director and writer Simon Callow, sung by the American tenor Jay Hunter Morris. It had its UK premiere at Welsh National Opera in a new production by Polly Graham in December 2015. Bell's third opera is an adaptation of the 1937 First World War epic poem In Parenthesis by David Jones. It was commissioned by Welsh National Opera and received its world premiere in May 2016 at the Wales Millennium Centre with further performances at the Royal Opera House in a production by David Pountney conducted by Carlo Rizzi.

Bell's chamber music has been performed internationally at venues including Carnegie Hall, the Alte Oper Frankfurt and Wigmore Hall London, the last having commissioned a song cycle from him premiered in June 2014, setting extracts of Shakespeare's fools, entitled These Motley Fools. It was premiered by the American countertenor Lawrence Zazzo. The Munich Opera Festival commissioned Bell's A Litany in Time of Plague for chamber orchestra and the mezzo-soprano Tara Erraught, with whom Bell worked in his first opera A Harlot's Progress.

New York City Opera commissioned Bell in 2018 to write the opera Stonewall to commemorate the 50th anniversary of the Stonewall riots in 1969, to be premiered on June 19, 2019, and directed by Leonard Foglia.

Works (selection) 
Operas
 A Harlot's Progress (Vienna, 2013)
 A Christmas Carol (Houston Grand Opera, 2014)
 In Parenthesis (Welsh National Opera, 2016)
 Jack the Ripper: The Women of Whitechapel (English National Opera and Opera North, 2019)
 Stonewall (New York City Opera, 2019)

Orchestra
 The Hidden Place
 A London Diurne
 A Litany in Time of Plague

Chamber music
 The Undying Splendour
 Day Turned into Night
 Cradle Suite
 These Motley Fools
 Daughters of Britannia

References

External links 
 
 
 Music sales classical
 Opera21 – Interview with composer Iain Bell
 Ganz schön verdorben: Die Uraufführung von Iain Bells A Harlot's Progress by Frieder Reininghaus, Neue Musikzeitung, 14 October 2013 
 http://www.wigmore-hall.org.uk/whats-on/productions/lawrence-zazzo-countertenor-simon-lepper-piano-33099 

21st-century classical composers
English classical composers
English opera composers
Male opera composers
English LGBT musicians
LGBT classical composers
LGBT classical musicians
1980 births
Musicians from London
Living people
English male classical composers
21st-century British male musicians